Río Grande Department is a department of Argentina in Tierra del Fuego Province, Argentina. The capital city of the department is situated in Río Grande.

References

Departments of Tierra del Fuego Province, Argentina